Kankroli is a twin City with Rajnagar, located in the district of Rajsamand in Rajasthan, India. Rajsamand is famous for Rajsamand lake built by Maharaja Raj Singh - I. Along the Rajsamand lake is the Kankroli town. It is known for its beautiful Dwarkadhish Ji Temple devoted to Lord Krishna.

History
Kankroli was an Jagir in the erstwhile Mewar state, consisting of 21 villages, granted to Gosain of the Dwarkadhish Temple as free grant. Dwarkadhish temple is 3rd peeth of Shuddhadvaita pushtimarg found by Jagadguru Vallabhcharyaji. Dwarkadhish was brought to Mewar in 1669 AD by descendants of Vallabhcharya and in 1671 AD village of Asotiya was granted to construct temple for Dwarkadhish. After construction of Rajsamand was completed in 1676 AD, Dwarkadhish Temple was shifted to its current location. Dwarkadheesh Temple is Third Peeth of Vallabh Sampraday. The present day head of Dwarkadhish Temple is trutiya pithadhish acharya varya bramharshi goswami shri 108 shri brijeshkumarji maharajshri.

Demographics
As per Census India 2011, the Rajnagar Nagar Parishad has a population of 67798 in 2011.

Civic administration
Rajsamand municipal board was created in 1956, which was promoted to Rajsamand Nagar Parishad in 2012.

Transportation
The town lies on NH-48 (old NH-8) Udaipur-Ajmer. Kankroli is a railway station on the meter gauge route between Mavali-Marwar Junction.

Economy
Kankroli is famous for the JK Tyre plant, which is one of the leading Tyre Manufacturers in India. A whole village is named after it known as JayKay Gram. 
The city is emerging as an administrative co-industrial center, with increasing businesses related to building materials and marble.

References

External links 
 Official site

Cities and towns in Rajsamand district